Daniel Marston is a British orienteering competitor. He received a bronze medal in relay at the 2003 World Orienteering Championships in Rapperswil-Jona, together with Jon Duncan and Jamie Stevenson. He finished 5th in the relay in 2004.

Marston's best individual world championship result was 14th place in the long course in 2003.

In domestic orienteering, Marston has won the British Championships once, in 2002.

See also
 British orienteers
 List of orienteers
 List of orienteering events

References

External links
 

Year of birth missing (living people)
Living people
British orienteers
Male orienteers
Foot orienteers
World Orienteering Championships medalists